André Joseph Abrial (19 March 1750, Annonay, Ardèche – 13 November 1828) was a French politician and Minister of Justice from 1799 to 1802.

References

1750 births
1828 deaths
People from Annonay
French Ministers of Justice
Members of the Sénat conservateur
Members of the Chamber of Peers of the Bourbon Restoration
Burials at Père Lachaise Cemetery